Abeysekera or Abeysekara is a Sinhalese surname.

Notable people
 Amila Abeysekara (born 1983), Sri Lankan actor
 Atula Abeysekera, Enterprise Risk Management Expert and a British Academic
 Chitrananda Abeysekera (1930–1992), Sri Lankan radio personality
 Hiran Abeysekera (born 1986), Sri Lankan actor
 Ishan Abeysekara (born 1993), Sri Lankan cricketer
 Karunaratne Abeysekera (1930–1983), Sri Lankan radio personality, poet and songwriter
 Manel Abeysekera (born 1933), Sri Lankan diplomat
 Milan Abeysekera (born 1993), Sri Lankan cricketer
 Piyal Abeysekera, Sri Lankan army officer
 Shani Abeysekara, Sri Lankan police officer
 Shantha Abeysekara, Sri Lankan politician
 Sunila Abeysekera (1952–2013), Sri Lankan activist
 Suraj Abeysekera (born 1958), Sri Lankan cricketer
 Tissa Abeysekara (1939–2009), Sri Lankan film-maker
 Vernon Abeysekera, Sri Lankan civil servant

See also
 
 

Sinhalese surnames